This list of birds of New Hampshire includes species documented in the U.S. state of New Hampshire and accepted by New Hampshire Rare Bird Committee (NHRBC) and New Hampshire Audubon (NHA). As of February 2021, the list contained 425 species. Of them, 136 are on the review list (see below) and six have been introduced to North America. Three are extinct and three have been extirpated. To this list are added seven hypothetical species, defined below; they are also tagged (R).

This list is presented in the taxonomic sequence of the Check-list of North and Middle American Birds, 7th edition through the 62nd Supplement, published by the American Ornithological Society (AOS). Common and scientific names are also those of the Check-list, except that the common names of families are from the Clements taxonomy because the AOS list does not include them.

Unless otherwise noted, the species listed below are considered to occur regularly in New Hampshire as permanent residents, summer or winter visitors, or migrants. The following codes are used to denote other categories of occurrence:

(I) Introduced - a species introduced to North America by the actions of humans
(E) Extinct - a recent species that no longer exists
(Ex) Extirpated - a species formerly present in New Hampshire which still exists elsewhere
(R) Review list - birds that if seen require more comprehensive documentation than regularly seen species. These birds are considered irregular or rare in New Hampshire.
(H) Hypothetical - "modern records which are likely accurate, but do not meet the current criteria for a first state record" per the NHRBC

Ducks, geese, and waterfowl
Order: AnseriformesFamily: Anatidae

The family Anatidae includes the ducks and most duck-like waterfowl, such as geese and swans. These birds are adapted to an aquatic existence with webbed feet, bills which are flattened to a greater or lesser extent, and feathers that are excellent at shedding water due to special oils. Forty-three species have been recorded in New Hampshire.

Black-bellied whistling-duck, Dendrocygna autumnalis (R)
Snow goose, Anser caerulescens
Ross's goose, Anser rossii (R)
Greater white-fronted goose, Anser albifrons (R) (at subspecies level only)
Pink-footed goose, Anser brachyrhynchus (R)
Brant, Branta bernicla
Barnacle goose, Branta leucopsis (R)
Cackling goose, Branta hutchinsii
Canada goose, Branta canadensis 
Mute swan, Cygnus olor (I)
Trumpeter swan, Cygnus buccinator (R)
Tundra swan, Cygnus columbianus (R)
Common shelduck, Tadorna tadorna (R)
Wood duck, Aix sponsa 
Blue-winged teal, Spatula discors 
Northern shoveler, Spatula clypeata
Gadwall, Mareca strepera 
Eurasian wigeon, Mareca penelope (R) (away from Great Bay)
American wigeon, Mareca americana
Mallard, Anas platyrhynchos 
American black duck, Anas rubripes 
Northern pintail, Anas acuta
Green-winged teal, Anas crecca 
Canvasback, Aythya valisineria
Redhead, Aythya americana
Ring-necked duck, Aythya collaris 
Tufted duck, Aythya fuligula (R)
Greater scaup, Aythya marila
Lesser scaup, Aythya affinis
King eider, Somateria spectabilis
Common eider, Somateria mollissima  (R) (any race other than dresseri; any inland)
Harlequin duck, Histrionicus histrionicus
Surf scoter, Melanitta perspicillata
White-winged scoter, Melanitta deglandi
Black scoter, Melanitta americana
Long-tailed duck, Clangula hyemalis
Bufflehead, Bucephala albeola
Common goldeneye, Bucephala clangula
Barrow's goldeneye, Bucephala islandica
Hooded merganser, Lophodytes cucullatus 
Common merganser, Mergus merganser
Red-breasted merganser, Mergus serrator 
Ruddy duck, Oxyura jamaicensis

New World quail
Order: GalliformesFamily: Odontophoridae

The New World quails are small, plump terrestrial birds only distantly related to the quails of the Old World, but named for their similar appearance and habits. One species has been recorded in New Hampshire.

Northern bobwhite, Colinus virginianus (Ex)

Pheasants, grouse, and allies

Order: GalliformesFamily: Phasianidae

Phasianidae consists of the pheasants and their allies. These are terrestrial species, variable in size but generally plump with broad relatively short wings. Many species are gamebirds or have been domesticated as a food source for humans. Turkeys have a distinctive fleshy wattle that hangs from the underside of the beak and a fleshy protuberance that hangs from the top of its beak called a snood. As with many galliform species, the female (the hen) is smaller than the male (the tom) and much less colorful. With wingspans of 1.5–1.8 meters (almost 6 feet), the turkeys are the largest birds in the open forests in which they live and are rarely mistaken for any other species. Grouse inhabit temperate and subarctic regions of the Northern Hemisphere. They are game and are sometimes hunted for food. In all New Hampshire species, males are polygamous and have elaborate courtship displays. These heavily built birds have legs feathered to the toes. Most species are year-round residents and do not migrate. Four species have been recorded in New Hampshire.

Wild turkey, Meleagris gallopavo
Ruffed grouse, Bonasa umbellus 
Spruce grouse, Canachites canadensis 
Ring-necked pheasant, Phasianus colchicus (I)

Grebes
Order: PodicipediformesFamily: Podicipedidae

Grebes are small to medium-large freshwater diving birds. They have lobed toes and are excellent swimmers and divers. However, they have their feet placed far back on the body, making them quite ungainly on land. Five species have been recorded in New Hampshire.

Pied-billed grebe, Podilymbus podiceps 
Horned grebe, Podiceps auritus
Red-necked grebe, Podiceps grisegena
Eared grebe, Podiceps nigricollis (R)
Western grebe, Aechmorphorus occidentalis (R)

Pigeons and doves

Order: ColumbiformesFamily: Columbidae

Pigeons and doves are stout-bodied birds with short necks and short slender bills with a fleshy cere.  Six species have been recorded in New Hampshire.

Rock pigeon, Columba livia (I)
Band-tailed Pigeon, Patagioenas fasciata (R)
Eurasian collared-dove, Streptopelia decaocto (I) (R)
Passenger pigeon, Ectopistes migratorius (E)
White-winged dove, Zenaida asiatica (R)
Mourning dove, Zenaida macroura

Cuckoos
Order: CuculiformesFamily: Cuculidae

The family Cuculidae includes cuckoos, roadrunners and anis. These birds are of variable size with slender bodies, long tails and strong legs. The Old World cuckoos are brood parasites. Two species have been recorded in New Hampshire.

Yellow-billed cuckoo, Coccyzus americanus 
Black-billed cuckoo, Coccyzus erythropthalmus

Nightjars and allies
Order: CaprimulgiformesFamily: Caprimulgidae

Nightjars are medium-sized nocturnal birds that usually nest on the ground. They have long wings, short legs, and very short bills. Most have small feet, of little use for walking, and long pointed wings. Their soft plumage is cryptically colored to resemble bark or leaves. Three species have been recorded in New Hampshire.

Common nighthawk,  Chordeiles minor 
Chuck-will's-widow,  Antrostomus carolinensis (R)
Eastern whip-poor-will,  Antrostomus vociferus

Swifts
Order: ApodiformesFamily: Apodidae

The swifts are small birds which spend the majority of their lives flying. These birds have very short legs and never settle voluntarily on the ground, perching instead only on vertical surfaces. Many swifts have long swept-back wings which resemble a crescent or boomerang. One species has been recorded in New Hampshire.

Chimney swift, Chaetura pelagica

Hummingbirds

Order: ApodiformesFamily: Trochilidae

Hummingbirds are small birds capable of hovering in mid-air due to the rapid flapping of their wings. They are the only birds that can fly backwards. Three species have been recorded in New Hampshire.

Ruby-throated hummingbird, Archilochus colubris 
Anna's hummingbird, Calypte anna (R)
Rufous hummingbird, Selasphorus rufus (R)
Calliope Hummingbird,  Selasphorus calliope (R)

Rails, gallinules, and coots

Order: GruiformesFamily: Rallidae

Rallidae is a large family of small to medium-sized birds which includes the rails, crakes, coots, and gallinules. The most typical family members occupy dense vegetation in damp environments near lakes, swamps, or rivers. In general they are shy and secretive birds, making them difficult to observe. Most species have strong legs and long toes which are well adapted to soft uneven surfaces. They tend to have short, rounded wings and to be weak fliers. Nine species have been recorded in New Hampshire.

Clapper rail, Rallus crepitans (R)
King rail, Rallus elegans (R)
Virginia rail, Rallus limicola 
Sora, Porzana carolina 
Common gallinule, Gallinula galeata 
American coot, Fulica americana
Purple gallinule, Porphyrio martinica (R)
Yellow rail, Coturnicops noveboracensis (R)
Black rail, Laterallus jamaicensis (R)

Cranes
Order: GruiformesFamily: Gruidae

Cranes are large, long-legged, and long-necked birds. Unlike the similar-looking but unrelated herons, cranes fly with necks outstretched, not pulled back. Most have elaborate and noisy courting displays or "dances". One species has been recorded in New Hampshire.

Sandhill crane, Antigone canadensis

Stilts and avocets
Order: CharadriiformesFamily: Recurvirostridae

Recurvirostridae is a family of large wading birds which includes the avocets and stilts. The avocets have long legs and long up-curved bills. The stilts have extremely long legs and long, thin, straight bills. Two species have been recorded in New Hampshire.

Black-necked stilt, Himantopus mexicanus (R)
American avocet, Recurvirostra americana (R)

Oystercatchers

Order: CharadriiformesFamily: Haematopodidae

The oystercatchers are large, obvious and noisy plover-like birds, with strong bills used for smashing or prying open molluscs. One species has been recorded in New Hampshire.

American oystercatcher, Haematopus palliatus

Plovers and lapwings

Order: CharadriiformesFamily: Charadriidae

The family Charadriidae includes the plovers, dotterels, and lapwings. They are small to medium-sized birds with compact bodies, short thick necks, and long, usually pointed, wings. They are found in open country worldwide, mostly in habitats near water. Seven species have been recorded in New Hampshire.

Northern lapwing, Vanellus vanellus (R)
Black-bellied plover, Pluvialis squatarola
American golden-plover, Pluvialis dominica
Killdeer, Charadrius vociferus
Semipalmated plover, Charadrius semipalmatus
Piping plover, Charadrius melodus 
Wilson's plover, Charadrius wilsonia (R)

Sandpipers and allies
Order: CharadriiformesFamily: Scolopacidae

Scolopacidae is a large diverse family of small to medium-sized shorebirds including the sandpipers, curlews, godwits, shanks, tattlers, woodcocks, snipes, dowitchers, and phalaropes. The majority of these species eat small invertebrates picked out of the mud or soil. Different lengths of legs and bills enable multiple species to feed in the same habitat, particularly on the coast, without direct competition for food. Thirty-four species have been recorded in New Hampshire.

Upland sandpiper, Bartramia longicauda 
Whimbrel, Numenius phaeopus
Eskimo curlew, Numenius borealis (E)
Long-billed curlew, Numenius americanus (Ex) (R)
Hudsonian godwit, Limosa haemastica
Marbled godwit, Limosa fedoa
Ruddy turnstone, Arenaria interpres
Red knot, Calidris canutus
Ruff, Calidris pugnax (R)
Stilt sandpiper, Calidris himantopus
Curlew sandpiper, Calidris ferruginea (R)
Sanderling, Calidris alba
Dunlin, Calidris alpina
Purple sandpiper, Calidris maritima
Baird's sandpiper, Calidris bairdii
Little stint, Calidris minuta (R)
Least sandpiper, Calidris minutilla 
White-rumped sandpiper, Calidris fuscicollis
Buff-breasted sandpiper, Calidris subruficollis
Pectoral sandpiper, Calidris melanotos
Semipalmated sandpiper, Calidris pusilla
Western sandpiper, Calidris mauri
Short-billed dowitcher, Limnodromus griseus
Long-billed dowitcher, Limnodromus scolopaceus
American woodcock, Scolopax minor 
Wilson's snipe, Gallinago delicata 
Spotted sandpiper, Actitis macularia 
Solitary sandpiper, Tringa solitaria 
Lesser yellowlegs, Tringa flavipes
Willet, Tringa semipalmata 
Greater yellowlegs, Tringa melanoleuca
Wilson's phalarope, Phalaropus tricolor
Red-necked phalarope, Phalaropus lobatus (R) (inland only)
Red phalarope, Phalaropus fulicarius (R) (inland only)

Skuas and jaegers
Order: CharadriiformesFamily: Stercorariidae

They are in general medium to large birds, typically with gray or brown plumage, often with white markings on the wings. They have longish bills with hooked tips and webbed feet with sharp claws. They look like large dark gulls, but have a fleshy cere above the upper mandible. They are strong, acrobatic fliers. Three species have been positively recorded in New Hampshire; another two have been reported.

South polar skua, Stercorarius maccormicki (R)
Pomarine jaeger, Stercorarius pomarinus (R) (inland only)
Parasitic jaeger, Stercorarius parasiticus (R) (inland only)
Long-tailed jaeger, Stercorarius longicaudus (R)

Auks, murres, and puffins

Order: CharadriiformesFamily: Alcidae

Alcids are superficially similar to penguins due to their black-and-white colors, their upright posture, and some of their habits, however they are only distantly related to the penguins and are able to fly. Auks live on the open sea, only deliberately coming ashore to nest. Seven species have been recorded in New Hampshire.

Dovekie, Alle alle (R) (inland only)
Common murre, Uria aalge (R) (inland only)
Thick-billed murre, Uria lomvia (R) (inland only)
Razorbill, Alca torda (R) (inland only)
Great auk, Pinguinus impennis (E)
Black guillemot, Cepphus grylle (R) (inland only)
Atlantic puffin, Fratercula arctica (R) (inland only)

Gulls, terns, and skimmers
Order: CharadriiformesFamily: Laridae

Laridae is a family of medium to large seabirds and includes gulls, terns, kittiwakes, and skimmers. They are typically gray or white, often with black markings on the head or wings. They have stout, longish bills and webbed feet. Thirty species have been recorded in New Hampshire.

Black-legged kittiwake, Rissa tridactyla
Ivory gull, Pagophila eburnea (R)
Sabine's gull, Xema sabini (R)
Bonaparte's gull, Chroicocephalus philadelphia
Black-headed gull, Chroicocephalus ridibundus 
Little gull, Hydrocoleus minutus
Ross's gull, Rhodostethia rosea (R)
Laughing gull, Leucophaeus atricilla 
Franklin's gull, Leucophaeus pipixcan (R)
Common gull/short-billed gull, Larus canus/Larus brachyrhynchus (R)
Ring-billed gull, Larus delawarensis 
Herring gull, Larus argentatus 
Iceland gull, Larus glaucoides
Lesser black-backed gull, Larus fuscus
Slaty-backed gull, Larus schistisagus (R)
Glaucous-winged gull, Larus glaucesens (R)
Glaucous gull, Larus hyperboreusGreat black-backed gull, Larus marinus 
Sooty tern, Onychoprion fuscata (R)
Least tern, Sternula antillarum 
Gull-billed tern, Gelochelidon nilotica (R)
Caspian tern, Hydroprogne caspiaBlack tern, Chlidonias NigerRoseate tern, Sterna dougallii 
Common tern, Sterna hirundo 
Arctic tern, Sterna paradisaea (R) (inland only)
Forster's tern, Sterna forsteri (R) (inland only) 
Royal tern, Thalasseus maxima (R)
Sandwich tern, Thalasseus sandvicensis (R)
Black skimmer, Rynchops niger (R)

Tropicbirds
Order: PhaethontiformesFamily: Phaethontidae

Tropicbirds are slender white birds of tropical oceans with exceptionally long central tail feathers. Their long wings have black markings, as does the head. Two species have been recorded in New Hampshire.

White-tailed tropicbird, Phaethon lepturus (R)
Red-billed tropicbird, Phaethon aethereus (R)

Loons

Order: GaviiformesFamily: Gaviidae

Loons are aquatic birds, the size of a large duck, to which they are unrelated. Their plumage is largely gray or black, and they have spear-shaped bills. Loons swim well and fly adequately, but are almost hopeless on land, because their legs are placed towards the rear of the body. Three species have been recorded in New Hampshire.

Red-throated loon, Gavia stellataPacific loon, Gavia pacifica (R)
Common loon, Gavia immerAlbatrosses
Order: ProcellariiformesFamily: Diomedeidae

The albatrosses are among the largest of flying birds, and the great albatrosses of the genus Diomedea have the largest wingspans of any extant birds. Two species have been recorded in New Hampshire.

Yellow-nosed albatross, Thalassarche chlororhynchos (R)
Black-browed albatross, Thalassarche melanophris (R) (H)

Southern storm-petrels

Order: ProcellariiformesFamily: Oceanitidae

The storm-petrels are the smallest seabirds, relatives of the petrels, feeding on planktonic crustaceans and small fish picked from the surface, typically while hovering. The flight is fluttering and sometimes bat-like. Until 2018, this family's three species were included with the other storm-petrels in family Hydrobatidae. One species has been recorded in New Hampshire.

Wilson's storm-petrel, Oceanites oceanicusNorthern storm-petrels
Order: ProcellariiformesFamily: Hydrobatidae

Though the members of this family are similar in many respects to the southern storm-petrels, including their general appearance and habits, there are enough genetic differences to warrant their placement in a separate family. One species has been recorded in New Hampshire.

Leach's storm-petrel, Hydrobates leucorhousShearwaters and petrels

Order: ProcellariiformesFamily: Procellariidae

The Procellariids are the main group of medium-sized "true petrels", characterized by united nostrils with medium septum and a long outer functional primary. Six species have been recorded in New Hampshire.

Northern fulmar, Fulmarus glacialisBlack-capped petrel, Pterodroma hasitata (R)
Cory's shearwater, Calonectris diomedeaSooty shearwater, Ardenna griseusGreat shearwater, Ardenna gravisManx shearwater, Puffinus puffinusStorks
Order: CiconiiformesFamily: Ciconiidae

Storks are large, heavy, long-legged, long-necked wading birds with long stout bills and wide wingspans. They lack the powder down that other wading birds such as herons, spoonbills and ibises use to clean off fish slime. One species has been recorded in New Hampshire.

Wood stork, Mycteria americana (R)

Frigatebirds
Order: SuliformesFamily: Fregatidae

Frigatebirds are large seabirds usually found over tropical oceans. They are large, black, or black-and-white, with long wings and deeply forked tails. The males have colored inflatable throat pouches. They do not swim or walk and cannot take off from a flat surface. Having the largest wingspan-to-body-weight ratio of any bird, they are essentially aerial, able to stay aloft for more than a week. One species has been recorded in New Hampshire.

Frigatebird species, Fregata sp. (R) (H)

Boobies and gannets
Order: SuliformesFamily: Sulidae

The sulids comprise the gannets and boobies. Both groups are medium-large coastal seabirds that plunge-dive for fish. Two species have been recorded in New Hampshire.

Brown booby, Sula leucogaster (R)
Northern gannet, Morus bassanusAnhingas
Order: SuliformesFamily: Anhingidae

Anhingas are cormorant-like water birds with very long necks and long straight beaks. They are fish eaters which often swim with only their neck above the water. One species has been recorded in New Hampshire.

Anhinga, Anhinga anhinga (R) (H)

Cormorants and shags
Order: SuliformesFamily: Phalacrocoracidae

Cormorants are medium-to-large aquatic birds, usually with mainly dark plumage and areas of colored skin on the face. The bill is long, thin, and sharply hooked. Their feet are four-toed and webbed. Three species have been recorded in New Hampshire.

Great cormorant, Phalacrocorax carboDouble-crested cormorant, Nannopterum auritum 
Neotropic cormorant, Nannopterum brasilianum (R)

Pelicans
Order: PelecaniformesFamily: Pelecanidae

Pelicans are very large water birds with a distinctive pouch under their beak. Like other birds in the order Pelecaniformes, they have four webbed toes. Two species have been recorded in New Hampshire.

American white pelican, Pelecanus erythrorhynchos (R)
Brown pelican, Pelecanus occidentalis (R)

Herons, egrets, and bitterns

Order: PelecaniformesFamily: Ardeidae

The family Ardeidae contains the herons, egrets, and bitterns. Herons and egrets are medium to large wading birds with long necks and legs. Bitterns tend to be shorter necked and more secretive. Members of Ardeidae fly with their necks retracted, unlike other long-necked birds such as storks, ibises, and spoonbills. Thirteen species have been recorded in New Hampshire.

American bittern, Botaurus lentiginosus 
Least bittern, Ixobrychus exilis 
Great blue heron, Ardea herodiasGreat egret, Ardea alba 
Little egret, Egretta garzetta (R)
Western reef-heron, Egretta gularis (R)
Snowy egret, Egretta thula 
Little blue heron, Egretta caerulea 
Tricolored heron, Egretta tricolorCattle egret, Bubulcus ibis 
Green heron, Butorides virescens 
Black-crowned night-heron, Nycticorax nycticorax 
Yellow-crowned night-heron, Nyctanassa violaceaIbises and spoonbills
Order: PelecaniformesFamily: Threskiornithidae

The family Threskiornithidae includes the ibises and spoonbills. They have long, broad wings. Their bodies tend to be elongated, the neck more so, with rather long legs. The bill is also long, decurved in the case of the ibises, straight and distinctively flattened in the spoonbills. Three species have been recorded in New Hampshire.

White ibis, Eudocimus albus (R)
Glossy ibis, Plegadis falcinellus 
White-faced ibis, Plegadis chihi (R)

New World vultures
Order: CathartiformesFamily: Cathartidae

The New World vultures are not closely related to Old World vultures, but superficially resemble them because of convergent evolution. Like the Old World vultures, they are scavengers. However, unlike Old World vultures, which find carcasses by sight, New World vultures have a good sense of smell with which they locate carcasses. Two species have been recorded in New Hampshire.

Black vulture, Coragyps atratus 
Turkey vulture, Cathartes auraOsprey
Order: AccipitriformesFamily: Pandionidae

Pandionidae is a family of fish-eating birds of prey possessing a very large, powerful hooked beak for tearing flesh from their prey, strong legs, powerful talons, and keen eyesight. The family is monotypic.

Osprey, Pandion haliaetusHawks, eagles, and kites

Order: AccipitriformesFamily: Accipitridae

Accipitridae is a family of birds of prey and includes the osprey, hawks, eagles, kites, harriers, and Old World vultures. These birds have very large powerful hooked beaks for tearing flesh from their prey, strong legs, powerful talons, and keen eyesight. Thirteen species have been recorded in New Hampshire.

Swallow-tailed kite, Elanoides forficatus (R)        
Golden eagle, Aquila chrysaetosNorthern harrier, Circus hudsonius 
Sharp-shinned hawk, Accipiter striatus 
Cooper's hawk, Accipiter cooperii 
Northern goshawk, Accipiter gentilis 
Bald eagle, Haliaeetus leucocephalus 
Mississippi kite, Ictinia mississippiensis (R) (away from Newmarket breeding site)
Red-shouldered hawk, Buteo lineatus 
Broad-winged hawk, Buteo platypterus 
Swainson's hawk, Buteo swainsoni (R) 
Red-tailed hawk, Buteo jamaicensis 
Rough-legged hawk, Buteo lagopus

Barn-owlsOrder: StrigiformesFamily: Tytonidae

Barn-owls are medium to large owls with large heads and characteristic heart-shaped faces. They have long strong legs with powerful talons. One species has been recorded in New Hampshire.

Barn owl, Tyto alba (R)

OwlsOrder: StrigiformesFamily: Strigidae

Typical owls are small to large solitary nocturnal birds of prey. They have large forward-facing eyes and ears, a hawk-like beak, and a conspicuous circle of feathers around each eye called a facial disk. Eleven species have been recorded in New Hampshire.

Eastern screech-owl, Megascops asio 
Great horned owl, Bubo virginianus 
Snowy owl, Bubo scandiacus
Northern hawk owl, Surnia ulula (R)
Burrowing owl, Athene cunicularia (R)
Barred owl, Strix varia 
Great gray owl, Strix nebulosa
Long-eared owl, Asio otus (R)
Short-eared owl, Asio flammeus 
Boreal owl, Aegolius funereus (R)
Northern saw-whet owl, Aegolius acadicus

KingfishersOrder: CoraciiformesFamily: Alcedinidae

Kingfishers are medium-sized birds with large heads, long, pointed bills, short legs and stubby tails. One species has been recorded in New Hampshire.

Belted kingfisher, Megaceryle alcyon

WoodpeckersOrder: PiciformesFamily: Picidae

Woodpeckers are small to medium-sized birds with chisel-like beaks, short legs, stiff tails, and long tongues used for capturing insects. Some species have feet with two toes pointing forward and two backward, while several species have only three toes. Many woodpeckers have the habit of tapping noisily on tree trunks with their beaks. Nine species have been recorded in New Hampshire.

Red-headed woodpecker, Melanerpes erythrocephalus
Red-bellied woodpecker, Melanerpes carolinus 
Yellow-bellied sapsucker, Sphyrapicus varius 
American three-toed woodpecker, Picoides dorsalis (R)
Black-backed woodpecker, Picoides arcticus 
Downy woodpecker, Dryobates pubescens 
Hairy woodpecker, Dryobates villosus 
Northern flicker, Colaptes auratus 
Pileated woodpecker, Dryocopus pileatus

Falcons and caracarasOrder: FalconiformesFamily: Falconidae

Falconidae is a family of diurnal birds of prey, notably the falcons and caracaras. They differ from hawks, eagles, and kites in that they kill with their beaks instead of their talons. Four species have been recorded in New Hampshire.

American kestrel, Falco sparverius 
Merlin, Falco columbarius 
Gyrfalcon, Falco rusticolus (R)
Peregrine falcon, Falco peregrinus

Tyrant flycatchersOrder: PasseriformesFamily: Tyrannidae

Tyrant flycatchers are Passerine birds which occur throughout North and South America. They superficially resemble the Old World flycatchers, but are more robust and have stronger bills. They do not have the sophisticated vocal capabilities of the songbirds. Most, but not all, are rather plain. As the name implies, most are insectivorous. Seventeen species have been recorded in New Hampshire.

Ash-throated flycatcher, Myiarchus cinerascens (R)
Great crested flycatcher, Myiarchus crinitus 
Tropical kingbird/Couch's kingbird, Tyrannus melancholicus/Tyrannus couchii (R)
Western kingbird, Tyrannus verticalis (R)
Eastern kingbird, Tyrannus tyrannus 
Scissor-tailed flycatcher, Tyrannus forficatus (R)
Fork-tailed flycatcher, Tyrannus savana (R)
Olive-sided flycatcher, Contopus cooperi 
Western wood-pewee, Contopus sordidulus (R)
Eastern wood-pewee, Contopus virens 
Yellow-bellied flycatcher, Empidonax flaviventris 
Acadian flycatcher, Empidonax virescens
Alder flycatcher, Empidonax alnorum 
Willow flycatcher, Empidonax traillii 
Least flycatcher, Empidonax minimus 
Eastern phoebe, Sayornis phoebe 
Say's phoebe, Sayornis saya (R)

Vireos, shrike-babblers, and erpornisOrder: PasseriformesFamily: Vireonidae

The vireos are a group of small to medium-sized passerine birds. They are typically greenish in color and resemble wood warblers apart from their heavier bills. Seven species have been recorded in New Hampshire.

White-eyed vireo, Vireo griseus
Bell's vireo, Vireo bellii (R)
Yellow-throated vireo, Vireo flavifrons 
Blue-headed vireo, Vireo solitarius 
Philadelphia vireo, Vireo philadelphicus
Warbling vireo, Vireo gilvus 
Red-eyed vireo, Vireo olivaceus

ShrikesOrder: PasseriformesFamily: Laniidae

Shrikes are passerine birds known for their habit of catching other birds and small animals and impaling the uneaten portions of their bodies on thorns. A shrike's beak is hooked, like that of a typical bird of prey. Two species have been recorded in New Hampshire.

Loggerhead shrike, Lanius ludovicianus (R) (Ex)
Northern shrike, Lanius borealis

Crows, jays, and magpiesOrder: PasseriformesFamily''': Corvidae

The family Corvidae includes crows, ravens, jays, choughs, magpies, treepies, nutcrackers, and ground jays. Corvids are above average in size among the Passeriformes, and some of the larger species show high levels of intelligence. Six species have been recorded in New Hampshire.

Canada jay, Perisoreus canadensis 
Blue jay, Cyanocitta cristata 
Black-billed magpie, Pica hudsonia
American crow, Corvus brachyrhynchos 
Fish crow, Corvus ossifragus 
Common raven, Corvus corax

Tits, chickadees, and titmiceOrder: PasseriformesFamily: Paridae

The Paridae are mainly small stocky woodland species with short stout bills. Some have crests. They are adaptable birds, with a mixed diet including seeds and insects. Three species have been recorded in New Hampshire.

Black-capped chickadee, Poecile atricapilla 
Boreal chickadee, Poecile hudsonica 
Tufted titmouse, Baeolophus bicolor

LarksOrder: PasseriformesFamily: Alaudidae

Larks are small terrestrial birds with often extravagant songs and display flights. Most larks are fairly dull in appearance. Their food is insects and seeds. One species has been recorded in New Hampshire.

Horned lark, Eremophila alpestris

SwallowsOrder: PasseriformesFamily: Hirundinidae

The family Hirundinidae is adapted to aerial feeding. They have a slender streamlined body, long pointed wings, and a short bill with a wide gape. The feet are adapted to perching rather than walking, and the front toes are partially joined at the base. Seven species have been recorded in New Hampshire.

Bank swallow, Riparia riparia 
Tree swallow, Tachycineta bicolor 
Violet-green swallow, Tachycineta thalassina (R) (H)
Northern rough-winged swallow, Stelgidopteryx serripennis 
Purple martin, Progne subis 
Barn swallow, Hirundo rustica
Cliff swallow, Petrochelidon pyrrhonota 
Cave swallow, Petrochelidon fulva (R)

KingletsOrder: PasseriformesFamily: Regulidae

The kinglets are a small family of birds which resemble the titmice. They are very small insectivorous birds. The adults have colored crowns, giving rise to their name. Two species have been recorded in New Hampshire.

Ruby-crowned kinglet, Corthylio calendula
Golden-crowned kinglet, Regulus satrapa

WaxwingsOrder: PasseriformesFamily: Bombycillidae

The waxwings are a group of passerine birds with soft silky plumage and unique red tips to some of the wing feathers. In the Bohemian and cedar waxwings, these tips look like sealing wax and give the group its name. These are arboreal birds of northern forests. They live on insects in summer and berries in winter. Two species have been recorded in New Hampshire.

Bohemian waxwing, Bombycilla garrulus
Cedar waxwing, Bombycilla cedrorum

NuthatchesOrder: PasseriformesFamily: Sittidae

Nuthatches are small woodland birds. They have the unusual ability to climb down trees head first, unlike other birds which can only go upwards. Nuthatches have big heads, short tails, and powerful bills and feet. Two species have been recorded in New Hampshire.

Red-breasted nuthatch, Sitta canadensis 
White-breasted nuthatch, Sitta carolinensis

TreecreepersOrder: PasseriformesFamily: Certhiidae

Treecreepers are small woodland birds, brown above and white below. They have thin pointed downcurved bills, which they use to extricate insects from bark. They have stiff tail feathers, like woodpeckers, which they use to support themselves on vertical tree trunks and limbs. One species has been recorded in New Hampshire.

Brown creeper, Certhia americana

GnatcatchersOrder: PasseriformesFamily: Polioptilidae

These dainty birds resemble Old World warblers in their structure and habits, moving restlessly through the foliage seeking insects. The gnatcatchers are mainly soft bluish gray in color and have the typical insectivore's long sharp bill. Many species have distinctive black head patterns (especially males) and long, regularly cocked, black-and-white tails. One species has been recorded in New Hampshire.

Blue-gray gnatcatcher, Polioptila caerulea

WrensOrder: PasseriformesFamily: Troglodytidae

Wrens are small and inconspicuous birds, except for their loud songs. They have short wings and a thin downturned bill. Several species often hold their tails upright. All are insectivorous. Six species have been recorded in New Hampshire.

House wren, Troglodytes aedon 
Winter wren, Troglodytes hiemalis 
Sedge wren, Cistothorus platensis (R)
Marsh wren, Cistothorus palustris 
Carolina wren, Thryothorus ludovicianus 
Bewick's wren, Thryomanes bewickii

Mockingbirds and thrashersOrder: PasseriformesFamily: Mimidae

The mimids are a family of passerine birds which includes thrashers, mockingbirds, tremblers, and the New World catbirds. These birds are notable for their vocalization, especially their remarkable ability to mimic a wide variety of birds and other sounds heard outdoors. The species tend towards dull grays and browns in their appearance. Three species have been recorded in New Hampshire.

Gray catbird, Dumetella carolinensis 
Brown thrasher, Toxostoma rufum 
Sage thrasher, Oreoscoptes montanus (A)
Northern mockingbird, Mimus polyglottos

StarlingsOrder: PasseriformesFamily: Sturnidae

Starlings are small to medium-sized Old World passerine birds with strong feet. Their flight is strong and direct and most are very gregarious. Their preferred habitat is fairly open country, and they eat insects and fruit. The plumage of several species is dark with a metallic sheen. One species has been recorded in New Hampshire.

European starling, Sturnus vulgaris (I)

Thrushes and alliesOrder: PasseriformesFamily: Turdidae

The thrushes are a group of passerine birds that occur mainly but not exclusively in the Old World. They are plump, soft plumaged, small to medium-sized insectivores or sometimes omnivores, often feeding on the ground. Many have attractive songs. Twelve species have been recorded in New Hampshire.

Eastern bluebird, Sialia sialis 
Mountain bluebird Sialia currucoides  (R)
Townsend's solitaire, Myadestes townsendi (R)
Veery, Catharus fuscescens 
Gray-cheeked thrush, Catharus minimus (R)
Bicknell's thrush, Catharus bicknelli (R) (away from breeding sites) 
Swainson's thrush, Catharus ustulatus 
Hermit thrush, Catharus guttatus 
Wood thrush, Hylocichla mustelina 
Redwing, Turdus iliacus (R)
American robin, Turdus migratorius 
Varied thrush, Ixoreus naevius

Old World flycatchersOrder: PasseriformesFamily: Muscicapidae

The Old World flycatchers are a large family of small passerine birds mostly restricted to the Old World. These are mainly small arboreal insectivores, many of which, as the name implies, take their prey on the wing.  One species has been recorded in New Hampshire.

Northern wheatear, Oenanthe oenanthe (R)

Old World sparrowsOrder: PasseriformesFamily: Passeridae

Old World sparrows are small passerine birds. In general, sparrows tend to be small plump brownish or grayish birds with short tails and short powerful beaks. Sparrows are seed eaters, but they also consume small insects. One species has been recorded in New Hampshire.

House sparrow, Passer domesticus (I)

Wagtails and pipitsOrder: PasseriformesFamily: Motacillidae

Motacillidae is a family of small passerine birds with medium to long tails. They include the wagtails, longclaws, and pipits. They are slender ground-feeding insectivores of open country. Two species have been recorded in New Hampshire.

White wagtail, Motacilla alba (R)
American pipit, Anthus rubescens

Finches, euphonias, and alliesOrder: PasseriformesFamily: Fringillidae

Finches are seed-eating passerine birds, that are small to moderately large and have a strong beak, usually conical and in some species very large. All have twelve tail feathers and nine primaries. These birds have a bouncing flight with alternating bouts of flapping and gliding on closed wings, and most sing well. Twelve species have been recorded in New Hampshire.

Common chaffinch, Fringilla coelebs (R)
Brambling, Fringilla montifringilla (R) 
Evening grosbeak, Coccothraustes vespertinus 
Pine grosbeak, Pinicola enucleator
House finch, Haemorhous mexicanus (Native to the southwestern U.S.; introduced in the east)
Purple finch, Haemorhous purpureus 
Common redpoll, Acanthis flammea
Hoary redpoll, Acanthis hornemanni
Red crossbill, Loxia curvirostra 
White-winged crossbill, Loxia leucoptera 
Pine siskin, Spinus pinus 
American goldfinch, Spinus tristis

Longspurs and snow buntingsOrder: PasseriformesFamily: Calcariidae

The Calcariidae are a group of passerine birds that have been traditionally grouped with the New World sparrows, but differ in a number of respects and are usually found in open grassy areas.  Four species have been recorded in New Hampshire.

Lapland longspur, Calcarius lapponicus
Chestnut-collared longspur, Calcarius ornatus (R)
Smith's longspur, Calcarius pictus (R) (H)
Snow bunting, Plectrophenax nivalis

New World sparrowsOrder: PasseriformesFamily: Passerellidae

Until 2017, these species were considered part of the family Emberizidae. Most of the species are known as sparrows, but these birds are not closely related to the Old World sparrows which are in the family Passeridae. Many of these have distinctive head patterns. Twenty-six species have been recorded in New Hampshire.

Cassin's sparrow, Peucaea cassinii (R)
Grasshopper sparrow, Ammodramus savannarum 
Lark sparrow, Chondestes grammacus
Lark bunting, Calamospiza melanocorys (R)
Chipping sparrow, Spizella passerina 
Clay-colored sparrow, Spizella pallida
Field sparrow, Spizella pusilla 
Fox sparrow, Passerella iliaca 
American tree sparrow, Spizelloides arborea
Dark-eyed junco, Junco hyemalis
White-crowned sparrow, Zonotrichia leucophrys
Golden-crowned sparrow, Zonotrichia atricapilla (R)
Harris's sparrow, Zonotrichia querula (R)
White-throated sparrow, Zonotrichia albicollis 
Vesper sparrow, Pooecetes gramineus 
LeConte's sparrow, Ammospiza leconteii (R)
Seaside sparrow, Ammospiza maritima 
Nelson's sparrow, Ammospiza nelsoni
Saltmarsh sparrow, Ammospiza caudacuta 
Henslow's sparrow, Centronyx henslowii (R)
Savannah sparrow, Passerculus sandwichensis 
Song sparrow, Melospiza melodia 
Lincoln's sparrow, Melospiza lincolnii 
Swamp sparrow, Melospiza georgiana 
Green-tailed towhee, Pipilo chlorurus (R)
Spotted towhee, Pipilo maculatus (R)
Eastern towhee, Pipilo erythrophthalmus 

Yellow-breasted chatOrder: PasseriformesFamily: Icteriidae

This species was historically placed in the wood-warblers (Parulidae) but nonetheless most authorities were unsure if it belonged there. It was placed in its own family in 2017.

Yellow-breasted chat, Icteria virens

Troupials and alliesOrder: PasseriformesFamily: Icteridae

The icterids are a group of small to medium-sized, often colorful passerine birds restricted to the New World and include the grackles, New World blackbirds, and New World orioles. Most species have black as a predominant plumage color, often enlivened by yellow, orange, or red. Eleven species have been recorded in New Hampshire.

Yellow-headed blackbird, Xanthocephalus xanthocephalus (R)
Bobolink, Dolichonyx oryzivorus 
Eastern meadowlark, Sturnella magna 
Western meadowlark, Sturnella neglecta (R)
Orchard oriole, Icterus spurius 
Bullock's oriole, Icterus bullockii (R)
Baltimore oriole, Icterus galbula 
Red-winged blackbird, Agelaius phoeniceus 
Brown-headed cowbird, Molothrus ater 
Rusty blackbird, Euphagus carolinus 
Common grackle, Quiscalus quiscula

New World warblersOrder: PasseriformesFamily: Parulidae

The wood warblers are a group of small often colorful passerine birds restricted to the New World. Most are arboreal, but some are more terrestrial. Most members of this family are insectivores.  Thirty-eight species have been recorded in New Hampshire.

Ovenbird, Seiurus aurocapilla 
Worm-eating warbler, Helmitheros vermivorus (R)
Louisiana waterthrush, Parkesia motacilla 
Northern waterthrush, Parkesia noveboracensis 
Golden-winged warbler, Vermivora chrysoptera (R)
Blue-winged warbler, Vermivora cyanoptera 
Black-and-white warbler, Mniotilta varia 
Prothonotary warbler, Protonotaria citrea (R)
Tennessee warbler, Leiothlypis peregrina 
Orange-crowned warbler, Leiothlypis celata
Nashville warbler, Leiothlypis ruficapilla
Connecticut warbler, Oporornis agilis
MacGillivray's warbler, Geothlypis tolmiei (R)
Mourning warbler, Geothlypis philadelphia 
Kentucky warbler, Geothlypis formosa (R)
Common yellowthroat, Geothlypis trichas 
Hooded warbler, Setophaga citrina (R)
American redstart, Setophaga ruticilla 
Cape May warbler, Setophaga tigrina 
Cerulean warbler, Setophaga cerulea (R) (away from Pawtuckaway State Park)
Northern parula, Setophaga americana 
Magnolia warbler, Setophaga magnolia 
Bay-breasted warbler, Setophaga castanea 
Blackburnian warbler, Setophaga fusca 
Yellow warbler, Setophaga petechia 
Chestnut-sided warbler, Setophaga pensylvanica 
Blackpoll warbler, Setophaga striata 
Black-throated blue warbler, Setophaga caerulescens 
Palm warbler, Setophaga palmarum 
Pine warbler, Setophaga pinus 
Yellow-rumped warbler, Setophaga coronata 
Yellow-throated warbler, Setophaga dominica (R)
Prairie warbler, Setophaga discolor 
Black-throated gray warbler, Setophaga nigrescens (R)
Townsend's warbler, Setophaga townsendi (R)
Black-throated green warbler, Setophaga virens 
Canada warbler, Cardellina canadensis 
Wilson's warbler, Cardellina pusilla

Cardinals and alliesOrder: PasseriformesFamily': Cardinalidae

The cardinals are a family of robust, seed-eating birds with strong bills. They are typically associated with open woodland. The sexes usually have distinct plumages. Ten species have been recorded in New Hampshire.

Summer tanager, Piranga rubra (R)
Scarlet tanager, Piranga olivacea 
Western tanager, Piranga ludoviciana (R)
Northern cardinal, Cardinalis cardinalis 
Rose-breasted grosbeak, Pheucticus ludovicianus 
Black-headed grosbeak, Pheucticus melanocephalus (R)
Blue grosbeak, Passerina caeruleaLazuli bunting Passerina amoena (R)
Indigo bunting, Passerina cyanea 
Painted bunting, Passerina ciris (R)
Dickcissel, Spiza americana''

Notes

References

See also
List of birds
Lists of birds by region
List of birds of North America

New Hampshire
New Hampshire-related lists